Harutyun Vardanyan (born 5 December 1970 in Gyumri, Armenian SSR) is a former Armenian football player who played defender for the Armenia national football team and for Armenian, Swiss and German clubs. He spent most of his club career in the Swiss Super League, playing for Lausanne, Young Boys, Servette, and Aarau. Vardanyan was also a key defender for the Armenia national football team, having played 62 international matches. He scored 1 goal since his debut in an away friendly match on 15 May 1994.

Vardanyan was the most diverse player of Armenia in the national team captaincy. He possessed uncompromising universalism, could play in any position in the defense and had a decent transfer. He also had the disadvantage of underachievement. Vardanyan could not keep up with the fast forward, but because of his experience could take a correct position, which are crossed by this lack roots.

Club career
Harutyun Vardanyan was born in Leninakan (now Gyumri), but began his career as a football player in Lori Vanadzor. In 1989, he returned to Leninakan, where he played for the local Shirak Gyumri. It is for this club Vardanyan played the most seasons and matches in the history of the club. As part of Shirak, Vardanyan won the Armenian Premier League three times and the Armenian Supercup once. In 1997, he was voted the Armenian Footballer of the Year. This season was the last in his career for his native club, for which he spent 9 years playing. That year, he signed a contract with Lausanne Sports, where he played for a season. He then moved to Cologne, where he played for Fortuna Köln. Vardanyan stayed at Fortuna Köln for two seasons, then returned to Switzerland and played for Young Boys Berne.

In 2003, he moved to the Servette Geneva. As part of Geneva, Vardanyan won bronze medals of the Swiss Super League. This success was the only 10-year-old Swiss career Vardanyan. After the end of the season, he moved to Aarau, where he continued to play for the club of the same name, FC Aarau. In early February 2005, Vardanyan was injured in a test match between Aarau and FC Seoul, which left him out of football for six months. In 2006, he moved to the club's first league FC Biel-Bienne, in which he ended his playing career. In total, Vardanyan had 524 matches at an official level, scoring 68 goals.

International career
Vardanyan's first match for the Armenia national football team happened on 15 May 1994 in an away game, the second game for Armenia in its history; against the national team of the United States. The only goal for the national team Vardanyan had was a goal against Albania in a home game on 6 September 1997. On 29 August 2005, in part to match against the Netherlands and the Czech Republic for the first time after a long break caused by trauma, figured Vardanyan. However, not having played any first-or second-in games, Vardanyan was included in a list of players for the next qualifying match for the 2006 FIFA World Cup qualification match against Andorra, though expressed his desire not to play for. Thus, he last played for the national team on 17 November 2004 in a 2006 FIFA World Cup qualification match against Romania.

Legal incident
In April 2007, Harutyun Vardanyan was placed in pre-trial detention by Swiss police for cases involving fines. Causes and circumstances of these penalties in the Swiss media had not been reported. Jean-Marc Hofstetter, President of FC Biel Bienne, for which at the time Vardanyan played for, was surprised by the event. In the end, it turned out that Vardanyan was arrested because he gave 4 people a ride in his Mercedes. Three did not have the right to enter the territory of Switzerland and the 4th came to watch the game of football club Biel-Bienne advocated by Vardanyan. However, the latter in no way influenced the police. Vardanyan was supported by the players, coaches and club management.

Personal life
Vardanyan and his family moved from Switzerland to the town of Mont-de-Marsan, France, in 2010. He is the owner and the operator of a small café on one of the central squares in the French town.

National team statistics

Honours

Club
Shirak Gyumri
Armenian Premier League (3): 1992, 1994, 1995
Armenian Supercup (1): 1996
Armenian Premier League Runner-up (3): 1993, 1995–96, 1997
Armenian Cup Runner-up (2): 1993, 1994

Individual
Armenian Footballer of the Year: 1997

References

External links

klisf.info
armfootball.tripod.com

legioner.kulichki.com
footballgraph.com

1970 births
Living people
Footballers from Gyumri
Soviet Armenians
Soviet footballers
Armenian footballers
Armenia international footballers
Armenian expatriate footballers
FC Shirak players
SC Fortuna Köln players
FC Lausanne-Sport players
BSC Young Boys players
Servette FC players
FC Aarau players
FC Biel-Bienne players
Armenian Premier League players
Swiss Super League players
Expatriate footballers in Switzerland
Expatriate footballers in Germany
Armenian expatriate sportspeople in Switzerland
Armenian expatriate sportspeople in Germany
Association football defenders